Brian Thomas Carroll (born December 15, 1949) is an American teacher who was the American Solidarity Party's presidential nominee in the 2020 United States presidential election. He is a proponent of Christian democracy.

Life and career 
Carroll received his bachelor's degree in history from UCLA and earned a teaching credential at California State University, Los Angeles. He taught junior high history and other subjects in Farmersville, California from 1977 to 1983. During that time, he also wrote for the Valley Voice newspaper, focusing primarily on the local need for public transportation. Carroll has taught students in Colombia and China and traveled extensively throughout Europe and Brazil. As an amateur naturalist, his work has been cited in studies on spiders and insects. In 2008, he returned to teaching in Farmersville.

2018 California congressional campaign 
Carroll ran for California's twenty-second congressional district in 2018, campaigning against Republican incumbent Devin Nunes and Democrat Andrew Janz. This was a contentious election due to Nunes' role in the 2018 Trump–Russia investigation. Carroll received 1,591 votes in the top-two primary, placing fifth in a field of six candidates. During the general election (after Carroll's elimination), Janz claimed that Carroll had endorsed him; Carroll publicly denied this claim.

2020 presidential campaign 

On April 5, 2019, Carroll declared his candidacy for President of the United States in the 2020 United States presidential election, seeking the nomination of the American Solidarity Party. He won the nomination at the online party convention, and chose ASP chair Amar Patel as his running mate.

Carroll notably spoke at the Rehumanize Conference in New Orleans, a speaking engagement at the Presidential Politics Conference of Iowa at Dordt University that was also attended by Republican candidate Joe Walsh and Democratic candidate Tulsi Gabbard. He participated in a Free & Equal Elections Foundation presidential debate, alongside minor candidates of various parties.

Carroll and his running mate Patel were on the ballot in eight states and certified as write-in candidates in 31 states. They received over 42,000 votes nationwide.

Endorsements

Political positions 
Carroll ran on a platform that espouses the political ideology of Christian democracy, which emphasizes G. K. Chesterton-style distributism as an alternative to capitalism which he opposes, a consistent life ethic, universal healthcare, climate and environmental stewardship, social justice and reconciliation, and a more peaceful world. His positions are similar to those espoused by other Christian Democratic parties in many European and Latin American countries.

Carroll subscribes to a consistent life ethic which opposes abortion, euthanasia, and the death penalty, while advocating for progressive and social justice issues. He supports Deferred Action for Childhood Arrivals, ranked choice voting, the breakup of companies such as Amazon and Google, amnesty for David Daleiden, diverting some police and military funding to community resources, ending private prisons, rehabilitation rather than incarceration for drug possession, and red flag laws. He is anti-abortion, and has said that being pro-life "obviously, is more than abortion" in reference to elderly people endangered by the COVID-19 pandemic.

Personal life 
Carroll has been married for 46 years, and has five children and 14 grandchildren. An elder in the Evangelical Covenant Church, a Pietist denomination, Carroll considers himself an Evangelical Christian.

Notes

References

External links

2020 campaign website

1949 births
Living people
American evangelicals
American Solidarity Party politicians
California State University, Fresno alumni
Candidates in the 2018 United States elections
Candidates in the 2020 United States presidential election
People from Visalia, California
University of California, Los Angeles alumni